The 2006 United States Federal Budget began as a proposal by President George W. Bush to fund government operations for October 1, 2005 – September 30, 2006.
The requested budget was submitted to the 109th Congress on February 7, 2005.

The government was initially funded through a series of three temporary continuing resolutions.  Final funding for the government was enacted as several appropriations bills enacted between August 2 and December 30, 2005.  As of 2018, this is the last fiscal year to be funded without the use of an omnibus spending bill or full-year continuing resolution.

Congressional action

Enacted Appropriations

Source

Total Receipts

Receipts by source: (in billions of dollars)

Total Spending
The President's budget for 2006 totals $2.7 trillion.  This budget request is broken down by the following expenditures:

$544.8 billion (20.90%) - Social Security
$512.1 billion (18.00%) - Defense
$359.5 billion (13.79%) - Unemployment and welfare
$345.7 billion (13.26%) - Medicare
$268.4 billion (10.30%) - Medicaid and other health related
$211.1 billion (8.10%) - Interest on debt
$88.7 billion (3.40%) - Education and training
$70.7 billion (2.71%) - Transportation
$68.4 billion (2.62%) - Veterans' benefits
$43.1 billion (1.65%) - Administration of justice
$38.4 billion (1.47%) - Foreign affairs
$31.2 billion (1.20%) - Natural resources and environment
$26.0 billion (1.00%) - Agriculture
$24.0 billion (0.92%) - Science and technology
$19.1 billion (0.73%) - Community and regional development
$17.8 billion (0.68%) - General government
$23.4 billion - Energy

Adjustments
-$698 billion (2.68%) - Undistributed offsetting receipts

2006 Deficit Estimate
(The amount that government spending exceeds total receipts)
 $500 billion

See also
 United States budget process

References

External links
 Status of Appropriations Legislation for Fiscal Year 2006

2006
2006 in American politics
United States federal budget